1990 Empress's Cup Final was the 12th final of the Empress's Cup competition. The final was played at Nishigaoka Soccer Stadium in Tokyo on March 31, 1991. Nikko Securities Dream Ladies won the championship.

Overview
Nikko Securities Dream Ladies won their 1st title, by defeating Suzuyo Shimizu FC Lovely Ladies on a penalty shoot-out.

Match details

See also
1990 Empress's Cup

References

Empress's Cup
1990 in Japanese women's football
Japanese Women's Cup Final 1990